Scrobipalpa erichi is a moth in the family Gelechiidae. It was described by Povolný in 1964. It is found in Austria, Slovakia, the Czech Republic, Hungary, Romania, North Macedonia, Moldova, Ukraine, the Middle East, China (Inner Mongolia, Xinjiang), Iran, and Mongolia.

The larvae feed on Lycium barbarum, Nicotiana tabacum, and Solanum species.

References

Scrobipalpa
Moths described in 1964